Roger Skerning (or Roger de Skerning; died 22 January 1278) was a medieval Bishop of Norwich.

Life
Skerning was a monk of Norwich Cathedral before he was elected Prior of Norwich in 1257.

Skerning was elected to the see of Norwich on 23 January 1266 and was consecrated on 4 April 1266.

In 1276, William Freney, titular archbishop of Edessa, was acting as Skerning's suffragan in Norwich.

Skerning died on 22 January 1278.

Citations

References
 British History Online Bishops of Norwich accessed on 29 October 2007
 British History Online Priors of Norwich accessed on 29 October 2007
 

Bishops of Norwich
1278 deaths
Year of birth unknown
13th-century English Roman Catholic bishops